James Verne Dusenberry (April 7, 1906 – December 16, 1966) was a well educated and publicly acclaimed scholar.  He is best known for his writings on and the relationships he built with many of the various Montana tribes throughout his lifetime.

Early life 
Verne Dusenberry was born in Corning, Iowa on April 7, 1906. When Dusenberry was very young his family moved to Montana.  His interest in Native Americans grew and he soon became well acquainted with the surrounding tribes of Montana from an early age. In 1937 he was adopted by a Pend d’Oreille chief and was given the name “Many Grizzly Bears”. After working his way through college and dealing with tuberculosis, he landed a job located on the Flathead Indian Reservation.

Dusenberry was married at one time and had a daughter named Lynn Dusenberry, who was very involved with her father's research.  She too, was well acquainted with the Montana Native tribes and assisted him with his book.

Education 
In Bozeman, Montana Dusenberry earned his bachelor's degree from Montana State College (now known as Montana State University) in 1927.  Before receiving his master's degree in anthropology at the University of Montana at Missoula, MT in 1956, Dusenberry was dean from 1945 to 1947 while teaching in Glendive at the Dawson Junior College.  He continued his research in Anthropology in Sweden and graduated in 1962 from the University of Stockholm with a Ph.D.  He was also in the Phi Kappa Phi, participated in the American Anthropological Association and in the Montana Academy of Science.

Professional life 
Dusenberry was an English teacher at Comertown High School from 1927 to 1928 in Comertown, Montana.  Then from 1928 to 1931, he was an English and Drama teacher at Hamilton High School in Hamilton, Montana.  He then moved to Glendive, Montana where he taught English and Drama at Dawson County High School from 1931 to 1935.  He taught only English in Columbia Falls, Montana at Columbia Falls High School for about a year (1944-1945).  In 1945 to 1947, Dusenberry was Dean, as well as English Instructor, at Dawson County Junior College in Glendive, Montana.  From 1947 to 1961, he was assistant professor in the Department of English at Montana State College (now known as Montana State University).  During a leave of absence from Montana State College, he was a Counselor and Consultant on the Special Indian Rehabilitation Project at Northern Montana College in Havre, Montana.

Native American Tribes in Montana 
Already during his education, Dusenberry began his work with the surrounding Montana Tribes.  During his time spent in Havre, MT in the course of compiling data as a visiting English Professor at the Northern Montana College, Dusenberry became acquainted with the Rocky Boy reservation Chippewa/Cree people.  However, his first engagement with Native people was in 1935, when he came across the Pend d'Oreille and Flathead people.

Influence 
Robert M. Pirsig was a personal friend and one of Dusenberry's supportive colleagues in the Montana State College English Department. Dusenberry appeared as a pivotal thematic figure in Pirsig's book Lila: An Inquiry into Morals. Pirsig said that "Verne was misunderstood and underestimated both as a person and as a scholar" and that he hoped that the publication of Lila "helps to set the record straight."

Published material 
You can find many of Dusenberry's primary source documents in the special collections section of Montana State University's library. Dusenberry's work from 1952 consists mostly of articles about the Montana Native Americans published in various journals and magazines. Here are a few that he has written: Chief Joseph's Flight Through Montana (Montana Magazine of History, Volume II, No. 3: 43–51) was his first article. Nation published Montanans Look at their Indians in 1955. The Significance of the Sacred Pipes to the Gros Ventre of Montana was published in Ethnos, Volume 26, pages 12–29 in 1961.  However, Dusenberry's most notable published work is his doctoral thesis, as well as his first book, The Montana Cree, A Study in Religious Persistence; it has been a guide through sustaining the ways of life in Native Americans religion.

Publications
	The Montana Cree, A Study in Religious Persistence (1962)
	Ceremonial Sweat Lodge of the Gros Ventre Indians (1962)
	The Significance of the Sacred Pipes to the Gros Ventre of Montana (1961)
	Notes on the Material Culture of the Assiniboine (1960)
	An Appreciation of James Willard Schultz (1960)
	Vision Experience of a Pend d’Oreille Indian (1959)
	Gaberiel Nattau's Soul Speaks (1959)
	Indians and the Pentecostals (1958)
	Waiting for a Day that Never Comes (1958)
	The Development of Montana's Indians (1957)
	Horn in the Ice (1956)
	Montanans Look at their Indians (1955)
	The Northern Cheyenne (1955)
	The Rocky Boy Indians (1954)
	Chief Joseph's Flight Through Montana (1952)

References

1906 births
1966 deaths
People from Corning, Iowa
People from Glendive, Montana
Montana State University faculty
University of Montana faculty
Stockholm University alumni
20th-century American anthropologists